The 2013 Greek Cup Final was the 69th final of the Greek Football Cup. It took place on 11 May 2013 at Olympic Stadium, between Olympiacos and Asteras Tripolis. It was Olympiacos' thirty seventh Greek Cup Final and second consecutive, in their 88 years of existence and Asteras Tripolis' first ever Greek Cup Final of their 72-year history.

Venue

This was the twentieth Greek Cup Final held at the Athens Olympic Stadium, after the 1983, 1984, 1985, 1986, 1987, 1988, 1989, 1990, 1993, 1994, 1995, 1996, 1999, 2000, 2002, 2009, 2010, 2011 and 2012 finals.

The Athens Olympic Stadium was built in 1982 and renovated once in 2004. The stadium is used as a venue for AEK Athens and Panathinaikos and was used for Olympiacos and Greece in various occasions. Its current capacity is 69,618 and hosted 3 UEFA European Cup/Champions League Finals in 1983, 1994 and 2007, a UEFA Cup Winners' Cup Final in 1987, the 1991 Mediterranean Games and the 2004 Summer Olympics.

Background
Olympiacos had reached the Greek Cup Final thirty six times, winning twenty five of them. The last time that had played in a Final was in 2012, where they had won Atromitos by 2–1 after extra time.

Asteras Tripolis had never competed in a Cup Final.

Route to the final

Match

Details

References

2013
Cup Final
Greek Cup Final 2013
Greek Cup Final 2013
Sports competitions in Athens
May 2013 sports events in Europe